Mogilivaripalli is a gram panchayat (village) in Bangarupalem mandal, Chittoor district, Andhra Pradesh, India.

References

Villages in Chittoor district